Darthe Capellan (born 27 April 1996) is a Canadian freestyle wrestler. He won one of the bronze medals in the men's 57 kg event at the 2022 Commonwealth Games held in Birmingham, England. At the 2019 Pan American Games held in Lima, Peru, he won one of the bronze medals in the men's 57 kg event.

Career 

He won the silver medal in the 50kg event at the 2013 Canada Summer Games held in Sherbrooke, Quebec.

In 2016, he won the gold medal in the 57kg event at the 2016 Pan American Wrestling Championships held in Frisco, United States.

In 2017, he won the bronze medal in the 61kg event at the Jeux de la Francophonie held in Abidjan, Ivory Coast. In 2018, he competed in the men's freestyle 57 kg event at the World Wrestling Championships held in Budapest, Hungary.

He represented Canada at the 2019 Pan American Games in Lima, Peru in the men's freestyle 57kg event. He lost his first match against Juan Rubelín Ramírez of the Dominican Republic but managed to win his bronze medal match against Óscar Tigreros of Colombia.

He lost his bronze medal match in his event at the 2022 Pan American Wrestling Championships held in Acapulco, Mexico. He won one of the bronze medals in the 57 kg event at the 2022 Commonwealth Games held in Birmingham, England. He competed in the 57kg event at the 2022 World Wrestling Championships held in Belgrade, Serbia.

Achievements

References

External links 
 

Living people
1996 births
Place of birth missing (living people)
Canadian male sport wrestlers
Wrestlers at the 2019 Pan American Games
Medalists at the 2019 Pan American Games
Pan American Games medalists in wrestling
Pan American Games bronze medalists for Canada
Wrestlers at the 2022 Commonwealth Games
Commonwealth Games medallists in wrestling
Commonwealth Games bronze medallists for Canada
21st-century Canadian people
Medallists at the 2022 Commonwealth Games